This was a new event in the 2015 ITF Women's Circuit.

The top seeds Han Xinyun and Hsu Chieh-yu won the title, defeating Thai sisters Varatchaya and Varunya Wongteanchai in the final, 3–6, 6–4, [10–8].

Seeds

Draw

References 
 Draw

2015 ITF Women's Circuit